Sun Capital Partners Limited is a British private equity firm headquartered in Central London.

History
Sun Capital Partners Limited was founded in 2001 by Hugh Osmond.

It is located on Portman Mews South in Marble Arch, central London.

In 2014, Sun Capital and TDR Capital acquired Keepmoat, a British housebuilding company.

References

External links
 

British companies established in 2001
Financial services companies based in London
Private equity firms of the United Kingdom
Companies based in the City of Westminster
Buildings and structures in Marylebone